Old Mother Riley in Paris is a 1938 British comedy film directed by Oswald Mitchell and starring Arthur Lucan, Kitty McShane, Magda Kun and C. Denier Warren. It is the second in the Old Mother Riley series of films, and is also known by its re-release title, Old Mother Riley Catches a Quisling.

Synopsis
Old Mother Riley is sacked from her job as a step cleaner at the office where her daughter Kitty works. She goes home to make steak and kidney pudding for their lodger, Joe, who is vaguely engaged to Kitty, but distractedly pours castor oil into the gravy, with amusing results. Jo is not sure he wants to be tied down to Kitty (or her impossible mother) and arranges for his travel agency employers to post him to Paris for six months, much to Kitty's discomfiture. While changing a light bulb, Old Mother Riley has a fall from a stepladder, resulting in her hospitalisation: keen to claim the maximum amount on her insurance she alters her medical records for the worse, only to be carried off for an emergency operation when the doctors see how much appears to be "wrong" with her. However, the ruse works: just as bailiffs are arriving to remove all Old Mother Riley's furniture, her insurance agent arrives with £250 in cash, which she uses to pay off her rental arrears and treat Kitty and herself to an air flight to Paris, in order to check up on Joe, who has meanwhile become involved with a suspicious young Parisian lady (really a spy with code name "Madame Zero", who believes he is an English agent).

Old Mother Riley, terrified by the air flight, parachutes out of the plane and on landing is taken to a Paris police station, where the Commissioner locks her up as the suspected spy "Madame Zero". She escapes and joins Kitty in their luxurious Paris hotel, where they cause chaos (and a custard pie fight) in the restaurant, by mistakenly ordering a trolley-ful of trifles. Checking up on Joe, they find him dancing in a café with "Madame Zero". Kitty is heartbroken, and Old Mother Riley drags her rival to the police station, demanding the woman should be locked up for alienating Joe's affections. When it emerges that the girl is in fact the mysterious "Madame Zero", Old Mother Riley is awarded a medal by the French authorities. She and Kitty return to England (by boat) and are joined by the repentant Joe, finally welcomed into the household by Old Mother Riley, who toasts the couple with champagne which she has smuggled through customs.

Cast
 Arthur Lucan - Mrs Riley
 Kitty McShane - Kitty Riley
 Jerry Verno - Joe
 Magda Kun - Madame Zero
 C. Denier Warren - Commissioner
 Stanley Vilven - Hotel Manager	
 Douglas Stewart - Randall, Chairman of Shipping Company
 George Wolkowsky - Apache	
 Richard Riviere - French Officer

Critical reception
TV Guide called it, "one of the most far fetched and yet most entertaining of the OLD MOTHER RILEY series...Daring deeds and Lucan's sharp characterization make for an irresistible romp." Britmovie called it, "probably (the) most amusing of the long-running Mother Riley series...This irresistible espionage romp in pre-war France has plenty of tired cooking and mother-in-law jokes but there are entertaining moments of energetic slapstick humour." DVD Times bemoaned that the film has "too much reliance on Kitty and no great set pieces (instead we get a series on individual gags which never build to anything)." Sky movies comments that it is "probably the funniest of all the Mother Riley comedies, this set up the long-running series, after a rather moderate opener, 'Old Mother Riley', had appeared the previous year...Made in the days when Lucan's real-life wife Kitty McShane still looked young enough to play his daughter."

References

External links

1938 films
1938 comedy films
British comedy films
British black-and-white films
Films scored by Percival Mackey
Films directed by Oswald Mitchell
1930s English-language films
1930s British films